Matilda Emily Kearns (born October 2, 2000) is an Australian water polo player who plays for the Australian national team.

Career 
She plays for University of Sydney. She plays for University of Southern California.

Kearns was a member of the Australian Stingers squad that competed at the Tokyo 2020 Olympics. The Head Coach was Predrag Mihailović. By finishing second in their pool, the Aussie Stingers went through to the quarterfinals. They were beaten 8-9 by Russia and therefore did not compete for an Olympic medal. Australia at the 2020 Summer Olympics details the team's performance in depth.

Her father, Phil, is a member of the Australian Rugby Hall of Fame.

References 

2000 births
Living people
Water polo players from Sydney
Australian female water polo players
USC Trojans women's water polo players
Water polo players at the 2020 Summer Olympics
Olympic water polo players of Australia
21st-century Australian women